Margaret Isabella Brownlee Dick (14 September 191825 September 2008) was a pioneering Australian microbiologist.  She is best known for her role as Chief Microbiologist at Kraft Foods Australia and for the development of a methodology for safe food production. She was the first woman to be elected as a Fellow of the Australian Institute of Food Science and Technology.

Personal life
Dick was born in Melbourne to immigrant Scottish parents, Margaret and James Dick. She was the youngest of the four children in the family. She descended from a long line of engineers on her paternal side, including her grandfather, father, and all of her uncles. Her mother was a housewife and tailor, while both of her sisters became teachers. Dick's maternal grandfather worked as an accountant.

The family moved from South Africa to Australia in 1914. Her parents decided to move away due to her father's risk of miner's phthisis and eminent war.

Dick never married. She died peacefully at her home in Mornington. She is survived by her niece and nephews.

Education 
Dick was educated at Kew State School, Mont Albert Central School (the leading central school in Melbourne at the time) and Melbourne Girls' High School. Her parents made financial sacrifices so that she and her siblings could attend the best schools. She graduated from the University of Melbourne in 1941 with a Bachelor of Science in Microbiology, Dietetics, and Biochemistry. While working at Kraft, she developed and introduced new microbiological methods into Australia for measuring a range of B group vitamins and amino acids.  This research led to her completion of a Master of Science in 1955. Her Master of Science degree was also awarded from the University of Melbourne.

Career
Upon graduating with a bachelor's degree, she found work in a medical microbiology laboratory in Adelaide, working under the supervision of several physicians. Shortly after, Dick returned to Melbourne where she won a role with the Kraft Walker Cheese Company (later Kraft Foods) as assistant to the senior microbiologist. She began working for Kraft Foods in 1942 and continued to work for them for 40 years. By 1949, she earned the title of Senior Microbiologist and eventually she would become the Chief Microbiologist for the entire company. She set the microbiology standards for all of the company's products and became an authority on bacteriophage interaction with cheese starters and the occurrence of Staphylococci in dairy products. She outlined and employed the protocols (from a microbiological perspective) for food product monitoring and equipment/employee surveillance that eventually became HACCP (Hazard Analysis by Critical Control Points) standards. She also assisted in the determination of a more effective methodology to test for penicillin in cow's milk. Her last few months of work before retirement, she committed to help set up a microbiology laboratory in Tanzania. She was an internationally revered expert in the field.

Committees 
Dick served on a number of committees including:
 Australian Dairy Produce Standards Organization 
 Australian Defense Forces Food Standards  
 NH&MRC Sub-Committee on Microbiological Food Standards  
 Standards Association of Australia.  
 Biological Advisory Committee of the National Association of Testing Authorities
She was the only person to serve on the microbiological subcommittee of NH&MRC food standards committee for the entire 25-year duration that it existed.

List of publications 
 "The Thermal Stability of Folic (Pteroylglutamic) Acid" appeared in Immunology & Cell Biology, May 1948
 "The Microbiological Assay of Folic Acid" appeared in the Australian Journal of Experimental Biology and Medical Science, May 1948
 "Fermentation of Food" was presented at the Academy of Science

Awards and recognitions 
In 1970, she won the Australian Institute of Food Science and Technology's Award of Merit. That same year, she became their first woman fellow. She became a Fellow of the Australian Academy of Technological Sciences and Engineering in 1977. In 2001, Dick was awarded a Centenary Medal for her contributions to food science and technology.

References

External links
 Margaret Dick interviewed by Hazel de Berg for the Hazel de Berg collection [sound recording], National Library of Australia
 Margaret Isabella Brownlee Dick (1918 - 2008), Encyclopedia of Australian Science
 Miss Margaret Dick (1918-2008), Interviews with Australian Scientists, Australian Academy of Science

1918 births
2008 deaths
Australian microbiologists
Women microbiologists
Australian women scientists
University of Melbourne alumni
Recipients of the Centenary Medal
20th-century women scientists
University of Melbourne women
Scientists from Melbourne
Australian people of Scottish descent
People educated at Mac.Robertson Girls' High School